Grevillea brevis is a species of flowering plant in the family Proteaceae and is endemic to the Northern Territory. It is an erect, open shrub with elliptic leaves and white to yellow or creamy-green flowers.

Description

Taxonomy
Grevillea brevis was first formally described in 1993 by Peter M. Olde and Neil R. Marriott in the journal Telopea, based on plant material collected in Kakadu National Park in 1990. The specific epithet (brevis) means "short", referring to the length of the pistil, compared to similar grevilleas, especially G. glabrescens.

Distribution and habitat
This grevillea usually grows in heathland on sandstone plateaux and is confined to a few areas on the Marawal Plateau in Kakadu National Park.

References

brevis
Proteales of Australia
Flora of the Northern Territory
Plants described in 1993